Tseng Hsiao-ping (born 6 August 1970), known by her stage name Tseng Hsin-mei is a Taiwanese Hokkien pop singer and television host. She has won two Golden Melody Awards, in 1996 and 2010, and one Golden Bell Award, in 2004.

Discography
 1988: 胭脂酒; Rouge Wine
 1989: 海口人; Haikou People
 1990: 冷情千千意千千
 1991: 娜奴娃的探戈
 1993: 愛情這呢冷
 1994: 酒是舞伴，你是性命
 1995: 天公疼憨人
 1996: 思念你的心肝，你敢知; Miss your Heart, You Dare to Know
 1996: 曾心梅舞厶ㄚˋ厶ㄚˋ 第一回 水車姑娘
 1996: 曾心梅舞厶ㄚˋ厶ㄚˋ 第二回 思慕的人
 1998: 認份; Recognition
 1998: 永遠不同; Forever is not Different
 1999: 幫你打 原曲新唱系列I
 1999: 幫你打 原曲新唱系列II
 2000: 甲天借膽
 2002: 半包菸; Half Pack of Cigarettes
 2009: 牽線; Pull strings
 2011: 珍愛心梅; Cherish Hsin-Mei
 2014: 雨水; Rainwater

References

1970 births
Living people
Taiwanese Hokkien pop singers
Taiwanese singer-songwriters
20th-century Taiwanese women singers
21st-century Taiwanese women singers